Hustle & Flow: Music from and Inspired by the Motion Picture is the soundtrack album for the motion picture, Hustle & Flow. It features music by P$C featuring T.I. & Lil Scrappy, Mike Jones featuring Nicole Wray, Trillville, Juvenile featuring Skip & Wacko, Nasty Nardo, 8Ball & MJG, Lil' Boosie & Webbie and other artists. Also featured on the album are tracks performed by the film's star, Terrence Howard, in his lead role as the street hustler-turned-rapper, Djay. The skits on the soundtrack are sound clips from the film. It was released on July 12, 2005 on Grand Hustle and Atlantic Records.

The first single off the collection was the Lil Jon-produced "I'm a King (Remix)" by P$C featuring T.I. and Lil Scrappy. A music video was released for the song which featured all three rappers in the city of Atlanta and clips from Hustle & Flow. The second single was the remix of Webbie's "Bad Bitch," featuring Trina. The soundtrack has sold over 300,000 copies. The chorus to Nasty Nardo's track entitled "Lets Get a Room" samples Project Pat's song entitled "Make Dat Azz Clap (Back Clap)".
The song number 4 in the track list "It's Hard out Here for a Pimp" produced by Three 6 Mafia won the Oscar for Best Original Song at the 78th Academy Awards ceremony and was performed on stage by the members of Three 6 Mafia.

Track listing

Charts

Weekly charts

Year-end charts

Songs

See also
Hustle & Flow
Hustler (disambiguation)

References

Drama film soundtracks
Hip hop soundtracks
2005 soundtrack albums
Atlantic Records soundtracks
Grand Hustle Records soundtracks
Albums produced by Lil Jon
Albums produced by Ryan Leslie
Gangsta rap soundtracks